Henry Howard, 6th Earl of Suffolk, 1st Earl of Bindon PC (1670 – 19 September 1718) was an English nobleman, styled Lord Walden from 1691 to 1706.

Lord Howard was born in London, the son of Henry Howard, 5th Earl of Suffolk. He was admitted to Magdalene College, Cambridge, in 1685. He was returned as Member of Parliament for Arundel in January 1694, but was unseated on petition by John Cooke in February. He was again returned for Arundel in 1695, holding the seat until 1698. From 1697 to 1707, he was Commissary-General of the Musters. In 1705, he was returned for Essex, but left the House of Commons when he was created Earl of Bindon in 1706. He was the Deputy Earl Marshal in England from 1706–1718. In 1708, he was appointed to the Privy Council.

In 1709, he succeeded his father as Earl of Suffolk. In 1715, he was appointed Lord Lieutenant of Essex and First Lord of Trade, offices he held until his death in 1718.

Howard married his first wife, Lady Auberie Anne Penelope O'Brien, daughter of Henry O'Brien, 7th Earl of Thomond, on 6 September 1691. She died in November 1703. They had four sons and one daughter. In April 1705, he married his second wife, Lady Henrietta Somerset, daughter of Henry Somerset, 1st Duke of Beaufort and widow of Henry Horatio O'Brien, Lord O'Brien. They had no children. He was succeeded in the earldom and in his Lord-Lieutenancy by Charles William, his eldest surviving son.

References

 Charles Mosley (ed.), Burke's Peerage, Baronetage & Knightage, 107th Edition, Wilmington, Delaware, 2003, vol III, pp. 3814–3817, 

1670 births
1718 deaths
17th-century English nobility
18th-century English nobility
People from London
Alumni of Magdalene College, Cambridge
Henry
Thomas
Lord-Lieutenants of Essex
Members of the Privy Council of Great Britain
Henry Howard, 06th Earl of Suffolk
English MPs 1690–1695
English MPs 1695–1698
English MPs 1705–1707
Presidents of the Board of Trade
Peers of England created by Queen Anne